Ackermans & van Haaren (often abbreviated as AvH) is a diversified group active in: Marine Engineering & Contracting (DEME, one of the largest dredging companies in the world - CFE, a construction group with headquarters in Belgium), Private Banking (Delen Private Bank, one of the largest independent private asset managers in Belgium, and asset manager JM Finn in the UK - Bank Van Breda, niche bank for entrepreneurs and the liberal professions in Belgium), Real estate and Senior Care (Nextensa, a listed integrated real estate group), Energy & Resources (SIPEF, an agroindustrial group in tropical agriculture), and Growth Capital.

The group focuses on a limited number of strategic participations with a significant potential for growth. AvH is listed on Euronext Brussels and is included in the BEL20 index and the European DJ Stoxx 600 index.

History
The company was founded in 1880 as a dredging company.  Although Ackermans & van Haaren is now a holding company, it is still active in the dredging sector through its subsidiary DEME.

References

External links
 

Companies based in Antwerp
Companies listed on Euronext Brussels